Aharon Ipalé (December 27, 1941 – June 27, 2016) was an Israeli-American actor, known for his roles in American and British film and television productions. His credits included Fiddler on the Roof (1971), Innocent Bystanders (1972), Raid on Entebbe (1977), Too Hot to Handle (1977), The Concorde ... Airport '79 (1979), The Happy Hooker Goes Hollywood (1980), Xanadu (1980), Who Dares Wins (1982), Eye of the Widow (1991), Son of the Pink Panther (1993), The Mummy (1999), and The Mummy Returns (2001).

Early life
Ipalé was born in Morocco on December 27, 1941. He arrived in present-day Israel with his family when he was just two years old as part of the early migration of Moroccan Jews to Israel. Ipalé enrolled in a theater school in London following his service in the Israeli Army.

Career
He began his acting career by appearing in British television series and theater productions, including the television mini-series, Christ Recrucified, in which he played the title role of Jesus Christ.

Ipalé was cast as Joshua in the 1973–1974 British mini-series, Moses the Lawgiver, which starred Burt Lancaster as Moses. His work in Moses the Lawgiver earned attention from Hollywood and led to his later work in the United States. His American television credits during the 1970s and 1980s included Hawaii Five-O, Wonder Woman, Dynasty, Kojak, The Love Boat, Knight Rider, MacGyver, Miami Vice and Charlie's Angels.
In Knight Rider, he played the role of Durant, the man who killed Michael Knight's fiancé Stephanie Maison, at the ceremony of his wedding, in the season four episode, "Scent of Roses".

In 1985, Ipalé appeared in the British dramatic film, The Shooting Party, which starred James Mason and John Gielgud. That same year, Ipalé appeared in the Israeli film, Gesher Tzar Me’od (1985). Two years later, he co-starred in the 1987 film, Ishtar, which was a notorious critical and box-office failure. More recently, Ipalé was best known for his recurring role as Pharaoh Seti I in The Mummy and its sequel, The Mummy Returns, both of which were directed by Stephen Sommers. In 2007, he appeared in Charlie Wilson's War.

Ipalé returned to Israel around 2012 after decades residing and working in London and Los Angeles. However, he was unable to recreate the professional success in Israel that he had enjoyed abroad.

Death
Aharon Ipalé died from cancer at Sheba Medical Center in Tel Hashomer on June 27, 2016, at the age of 74. He was being treated for the disease for several months. Ipalé, who was survived by his daughter, was buried in Holon.

Filmography

References

External links

1941 births
2016 deaths
American male film actors
American male television actors
American people of Moroccan-Jewish descent
Deaths from cancer in Israel
Israeli expatriates in the United States
Israeli male film actors
Israeli male television actors
Israeli people of Moroccan-Jewish descent
Jewish Israeli male actors
Moroccan emigrants to Israel
People with acquired American citizenship